Castlerahan is a Gaelic football club from Ballyjamesduff, County Cavan, Ireland. They take their name from the Castlerahan barony in which Ballyjamesduff is located.

History
The club was founded in its current state in 1961, Ballyjamesduff and Castlerahan fielding separate teams prior to then. The club reached its first Senior Championship final in 1968, losing to Crosserlough.

In 2011, the club reached its first senior final since 1968. They lost the final heavily to Cavan Gaels. It was four years before Castlerahan reached another county final against Kingscourt Stars in 2015. Castlerahan came up one point short on that occasion. Castlerahan lost further finals to neighbours Ramor United after a replay in 2016, and to Cavan Gaels again in 2017.

Castlerahan played in their fourth consecutive final in 2018, facing Crosserlough. Having been six points down, they staged a comeback to win by a point and finally win their first senior championship. Castlerahan successfully defended their title in 2019 by defeating Ramor United.

After being relegated in 2021, Castlerahan won the 2022 Intermediate Championship title to seal a quick return to the senior grade.

Honours
Cavan Senior Football Championship: 2
 2018, 2019
Cavan Intermediate Football Championship: 3
 1966, 2001, 2022
 Cavan Junior Football Championship: 5
 1951, 1959, 1965, 1987, 1991
 Cavan Under-21 Football Championship: 2
 2006, 2007
 Cavan Minor Football Championship: 2
 2005, 2012

Notable players
 Cian Mackey
 John Nallen

References

External links
Castlerahan Official Website *Official Cavan GAA Website 
Cavan Club GAA

Ballyjamesduff
Gaelic games clubs in County Cavan
Gaelic football clubs in County Cavan